Continuous wavelets of compact support alpha can be built, which are related to the beta distribution. The process is derived from probability distributions using blur derivative. These new wavelets have just one cycle, so they are termed unicycle wavelets. Closed-form expressions for beta wavelets and scale functions as well as their spectra are derived. Their importance is due to the Central Limit Theorem by Gnedenko and Kolmogorov applied for compactly supported signals.

Beta distribution 

The beta distribution is a continuous probability distribution defined over the interval .  It is characterised by a couple of parameters, namely  and   according to:

.

Gnedenko-Kolmogorov central limit theorem revisited 

Let  be a probability density of the random variable ,  i.e.

Suppose that all variables are independent.

The mean and the variance of a given random variable  are, respectively

 .

The density  of the random variable corresponding to the sum  is given by the

Central Limit Theorem for distributions of compact support (Gnedenko and Kolmogorov).

Let  be distributions such that .

 
 

where  and

Beta wavelets 
Since  is unimodal, the wavelet generated by

 
has only one-cycle (a negative half-cycle and a positive half-cycle).

The parameter  is referred to as “cyclic balance”, and is defined as the ratio between the lengths of the causal and non-causal piece of the wavelet. The instant of transition  from the first to the second half cycle is given by

The (unimodal) scale function associated with the wavelets is given by

 .

A closed-form expression for first-order beta wavelets can easily be derived. Within their support,

Beta wavelet spectrum 

The beta wavelet spectrum can be derived in terms of the Kummer hypergeometric function.

Let  denote the Fourier transform pair associated with the wavelet.

It can be proved by applying properties of the Fourier transform that

where .

Only symmetrical  cases have zeroes in the spectrum. A few asymmetric  beta wavelets are shown in Fig. Inquisitively, they are parameter-symmetrical in the sense that they hold 

Higher derivatives may also generate further beta wavelets.  Higher order beta wavelets are defined by

This is henceforth referred to as an -order beta wavelet. They exist for order . After some algebraic handling, their closed-form expression can be found:

Application 
Wavelet theory is applicable to several subjects. All wavelet transforms may be considered forms of time-frequency representation for continuous-time (analog) signals and so are related to harmonic analysis. Almost all practically useful discrete wavelet transforms use discrete-time filter banks. Similarly, Beta wavelet and its derivative are utilized in several real-time engineering applications such as image compression, bio-medical signal compression, image recognition [9] etc.

References

Further reading
 W.B. Davenport, Probability and Random Processes, McGraw-Hill, Kogakusha, Tokyo, 1970.

External links

https://jcis.sbrt.org.br/jcis/issue/view/27
 http://www.de.ufpe.br/~hmo/WEBLET.html
 http://www.de.ufpe.br/~hmo/beta.html
Continuous wavelets